The 1974 Massachusetts general election was held on November 5, 1974, throughout Massachusetts. Democratic and Republican candidates were selected in party primaries held September 10, 1974.

The Democratic primary in this election was notably competitive, with formidable challenges to two incumbent Democrats (Secretary of the Commonwealth John Davoren, who lost, and Treasurer Robert Q. Crane, who narrowly won) and two open primaries (for Governor and Attorney General).

In the general election, Democrats swept the statewide offices quite easily. Republican support may have been held down by the weight of the ongoing Watergate scandal and the resignation of President Richard Nixon.

Governor and Lieutenant Governor

Democrats Michael Dukakis and Thomas P. O'Neill III were elected Governor and Lieutenant Governor, respectively, over Republican incumbents Francis W. Sargent and Donald R. Dwight.

Attorney General

Attorney General Robert H. Quinn declined to run for re-election and instead ran for Governor. In the open primary to fill his seat, former Lt. Governor Francis X. Bellotti won the Democratic nomination.

Bellotti defeated Republican nominee Josiah Spaulding in a close race.

Democratic primary

Candidates
Francis X. Bellotti, former Lt. Governor and nominee for Governor in 1964
Barry T. Hannon, Norfolk County Register of Deeds
Edward Francis Harrington, attorney and former prosecutor of Raymond L.S. Patriarca
Edward M. O'Brien
S. Lester Ralph, mayor of Somerville and Episcopal minister
George Sacco, State Representative from Medford

Results

Republican primary

Candidates
Charles Codman Cabot Jr., chairman of the Outdoor Advertising Board
William I. Cowin, Massachusetts Secretary of Administration and Finance
Josiah Spaulding, former chair of the Massachusetts Republican Party and nominee for U.S. Senate in 1970

Results

General election

Secretary of the Commonwealth

Secretary of the Commonwealth John Davoren was defeated in the Democratic primary by Paul Guzzi. Guzzi went on to defeat Republican State Senator John M. Quinlan in the general election.

Democratic primary

Candidates
John Davoren, incumbent Secretary of the Commonwealth
Paul Guzzi, State Representative from Newton

Results

Republican primary

Candidates

Declared
John M. Quinlan, State Senator

Withdrew at convention
Ron Burton, former Boston Patriots running back

Results
Following Burton's withdrawal, Quinlan was unopposed for the Republican nomination.

General election

Treasurer and Receiver-General

Incumbent Treasurer and Receiver-General Robert Q. Crane defeated Charles Mark Furcolo in the Democratic Primary.

Erna Ballantine ran an unsuccessful sticker campaign for the Republican nomination.

Democratic primary

Candidates
Robert Q. Crane, incumbent Treasurer and Receiver-General
Charles Mark Furcolo, Boston attorney and son of Foster Furcolo

Results

General election

Auditor
Incumbent Auditor Thaddeus M. Buczko was unopposed in the Democratic primary and the general election.

General election

United States House of Representatives

All of Massachusetts' twelve seats in the United States House of Representatives were up for election in 2018.

Ten seats were won by candidates seeking re-election. 

The 3rd District seat was won by Joseph D. Early, who succeeded retiring Democrat Harold Donohue. The 5th District seat was won by Democrat Paul Tsongas, who defeated incumbent Republican Paul W. Cronin.

References

 
Massachusetts